Southerland-Burnette House is a historic home in the Mount Olive Historic District in Mount Olive, Wayne County, North Carolina. It was built about 1874 and extensively altered in 1924 in the Classical Revival style. It is a two-story, three-bay, frame dwelling with a gable roof. The front facade features a two-story tetra-style portico with Tuscan order columns.

It was listed on the National Register of Historic Places in 1988.

References

Houses on the National Register of Historic Places in North Carolina
Neoclassical architecture in North Carolina
Houses completed in 1924
Houses in Wayne County, North Carolina
National Register of Historic Places in Wayne County, North Carolina
Historic district contributing properties in North Carolina